The Women's 200m T36 had its Final held on September 13 at 10:40.

Medalists

Results

References
Final

Athletics at the 2008 Summer Paralympics
2008 in women's athletics